Tugatog is a barangay of Malabon in Metro Manila in the Philippines.

References

Barangays of Metro Manila
Malabon